Evanildo Fernandes Gomes (born 1 May 1986), known as Nildo Petrolina, is a Brazilian professional footballer who plays as a midfielder for Sociedade Desportiva Juazeirense.

He spent most of his career in Portugal, making 153 Primeira Liga appearances for Beira-Mar, Arouca, Moreirense and Aves and scoring 18 goals. He won the Taça da Liga for the third of those clubs in 2017, and the Taça de Portugal for the fourth a year later.

Club career
Born in Petrolina, Pernambuco, Petrolina only played lower league football in his country. In 2010 the 24-year old moved to Portugal where he would spend the vast majority of his professional career, starting out at C.D. Trofense in the Segunda Liga.

Petrolina signed with Primeira Liga club S.C. Beira-Mar for the 2011–12 season. He made his debut in the competition on 14 August 2011, starting and playing 80 minutes in a 0–0 away draw against C.S. Marítimo. His first goal arrived two weeks later, when he helped to a 3–0 away win over Vitória de Guimarães.

On 5 July 2014, after one year in Hungary with Videoton FC where he scored eight goals from 35 competitive appearances, Petrolina signed a two-year contract with F.C. Arouca also of the Portuguese top division. In late January 2016, however, he joined fellow league team Moreirense FC.

In May 2017, Petrolina and compatriot teammate Diego Galo moved to C.D. Aves. He played six games as they won the Taça de Portugal for the first time, and scored the only goal from the penalty spot as they defeated Caldas S.C. in the semi-final first leg on 28 February 2018.

Petrolina left Portugal on 9 January 2019, when he signed for Pedro Emanuel's Al Taawoun FC of the Saudi Professional League. A year later, he extended his deal for another.

In July 2021, Petrolina joined Leixões S.C. in the Portuguese second tier. The 35-year-old announced his retirement in October, only to return to his country with Sociedade Desportiva Juazeirense in February 2022.

Honours
Videoton
Ligakupa runner-up: 2013–14

Moreirense
Taça da Liga: 2016–17

Aves
Taça de Portugal: 2017–18

Al Taawoun
Kings Cup: 2019

References

External links

1986 births
Living people
People from Petrolina
Sportspeople from Pernambuco
Brazilian footballers
Association football midfielders
Campeonato Brasileiro Série C players
Campeonato Brasileiro Série D players
Salgueiro Atlético Clube players
Primeira Liga players
Liga Portugal 2 players
C.D. Trofense players
S.C. Beira-Mar players
F.C. Arouca players
Moreirense F.C. players
C.D. Aves players
Leixões S.C. players
Nemzeti Bajnokság I players
Fehérvár FC players
Saudi Professional League players
Al-Taawoun FC players
Brazilian expatriate footballers
Expatriate footballers in Portugal
Expatriate footballers in Hungary
Expatriate footballers in Saudi Arabia
Brazilian expatriate sportspeople in Portugal
Brazilian expatriate sportspeople in Hungary
Brazilian expatriate sportspeople in Saudi Arabia